Zhaksylyk Ushkempirov (6 May 1951 – 2 August 2020) was a light-flyweight Greco-Roman wrestler from Kazakhstan. He won an Olympic gold medal in 1980 and a world title in 1981.

Ushkempirov took up wrestling in 1969 and won the Soviet title in 1975 and 1980. After retiring from competitions he worked as director of a sports school in Almaty in 1984–1993. In 1993 he founded the sports club Zhaksylyk and served as its president. Since 2001, an annual junior wrestling tournament has been held in Almaty in his honor.

Memory 
In 2019, a feature film "Zhaksylyk" (Kazakhstan) was shot about the life of Zhaksylyk Ushkempirov. Ushkempirov was played by Elnar Nazarkul and Sanurzhan Suleimenov in his youth and adolescence, and the role of a 60-year-old athlete was played by Doszhan Zhanbotaev.

On December 2, 2020, the Martial Arts Palace in Nur-Sultan was renamed in honor of Zhaksylyk Ushkempirov.

On September 8, 2021, a monument was unveiled next to him

References

1951 births
2020 deaths
People from Jambyl Region
Soviet male sport wrestlers
Olympic wrestlers of the Soviet Union
Wrestlers at the 1980 Summer Olympics
Kazakhstani male sport wrestlers
Olympic gold medalists for the Soviet Union
Olympic medalists in wrestling
Honoured Masters of Sport of the USSR
World Wrestling Championships medalists
Medalists at the 1980 Summer Olympics